Martelle, Iowa is a city in Jones County, Iowa, United States. The population was 249 at the time of the 2020 census. It is part of the Cedar Rapids Metropolitan Statistical Area.

History 
Martelle was platted in 1872 when the Chicago, Milwaukee, St. Paul and Pacific Railroad was being built through the neighborhood.

Geography
Martelle is located at  (42.020421, -91.358314).

Demographics

2010 census
As of the census of 2010, there were 255 people, 114 households, and 81 families living in the city. The racial makeup of the city was 97.6% White, 1.6% Asian, and 0.8% from two or more races. Hispanic or Latino of any race were 0.8% of the population.

There were 114 households, of which 19.3% had children under the age of 18 living with them, 61.4% were married couples living together, 7.0% had a female householder with no husband present, 2.6% had a male householder with no wife present, and 28.9% were non-families. 20.2% of all households were made up of individuals, and 10.5% had someone living alone who was 65 years of age or older. The average household size was 2.24 and the average family size was 2.59.

The median age in the city was 45.7 years. 16.5% of residents were under the age of 18; 7.4% were between the ages of 18 and 24; 23.5% were from 25 to 44; 31.4% were from 45 to 64; and 21.2% were 65 years of age or older. The gender makeup of the city was 48.2% male and 51.8% female.

2000 census
As of the census of 2000, there were 280 people, 109 households, and 85 families living in the city. The racial makeup of the city was 99.29% White, 0.36% Asian, and 0.36% from two or more races.

The median income for a household in the city was $47,500, and the median income for a family was $50,313. Males had a median income of $32,500 versus $21,964 for females. The per capita income for the city was $20,134. About 2.5% of families and 2.9% of the population were below the poverty line, including 2.5% of those under the age of eighteen and none of those sixty-five or over.

Education 
Anamosa Community School District operates schools serving this community.

References

Cities in Iowa
Cities in Jones County, Iowa
Cedar Rapids, Iowa metropolitan area